This list includes commanders of the Aegean Army, who were, in their time of service, nominal heads of the Aegean Army, one of the four field armies of the Turkish Land Forces.

The current Commander of the Aegean Army is Lieutenant general Ali Sivri, since 22 August 2019.

See also 
 Chief of the Turkish General Staff
 List of commanders of the Turkish Land Forces

References 

Commanders of the Aegean Army
Commanders of Aegean Army